The Thomas Parry Library at Aberystwyth was part of the library of the University of Wales Aberystwyth, it served the Department of Information Studies, Department of Law and Criminology and the School of Management & Business. It opened in June 1970 and closed 10th August 2018.

History
The Library was opened in June 1970 to serve the College of Librarianship Wales. The architect was G. R. Bruce, the builder G. M. Jenkins and Sons, Tregaron and it cost £135,000.

When in 1989, the College of Librarianship Wales became part of the University of Wales Aberystwyth, under the name of the 'Department of Information and Library Studies' [DILS], the library became part of the University's Library service. This, in 1995, joined the University's Computing and Audio-visual Units to form Information Service, University of Wales, Aberystwyth.

In August 1995 the library was renamed the Thomas Parry Library. It was named after the distinguished scholar, and former librarian at the National Library of Wales, Sir Thomas Parry.

In 1996 the Welsh Agricultural College (WAC), another previously autonomous institution located on Aberystwyth's Llanbadarn Fawr Campus, merged with UWA to form the Welsh Institute of Rural Studies [WIRS]. The library of the former WAC (which also served the adjacent Coleg Ceredigion) merged with the Thomas Parry Library, which was extended and substantially re-modelled to cope with the substantial increase in stock, staff and readers.

Since closing in August 2018, the Thomas Parry Library collections and services are now held at the university's Hugh Owen Library. The former Thomas Parry Library is currently being used as a Covid-19 vaccination centre site.

Before the library's closure a memorial event 'Thomas Parry Library: a celebration' was held on 19th July 2018 at the library with former and current library staff including Alan Clark, Bill Hines and Elizabeth Kensler.

References

External links
 

Library buildings completed in 1970
Academic libraries in the United Kingdom
Aberystwyth University
Buildings and structures in Aberystwyth
Former library buildings in Wales
Defunct_libraries